The Rest Of Us is an album by the band Gas Huffer, released in 2002. It was produced by Jack Endino.

Track listing
  "The Rest Of Us"
  "The Day The Bottom Fell Out"
  "Dig That, Do That"
  "Aldedly Blues"
  "Ghost In The Lighthouse"
  "Lexington Nightlife"
  "Glass Bottom Boat"
  "Goodbye Crescent"
  "Third Party Man"
  "Horse And Wagon"
  "I'm So Delighted"
  "Ink Dries"
  "Berlin To New York, 1937"
  "Babytown"

References

Gas Huffer albums
2002 albums
Albums produced by Jack Endino